Aron Dean Pollock (born 23 March 1998) is an English professional footballer who plays for Concord Rangers, as a defender.

Club career
Drafted into the Leyton Orient first team squad during early 2016, Pollock went on a work experience loan to Isthmian League club Wingate & Finchley on 4 March 2016.

Pollock made his Orient first team debut on 30 April in the starting lineup for the final home match of the season, against Mansfield Town. Pollock impressed in his opening performance, being voted Man of the Match and subsequently starting in the following match against Yeovil, in the final match of the season.

Following a short-term loan spell at National League South side Wealdstone, Pollock joined Isthmian League Premier Division side Leatherhead on a one-month loan in December 2017. He went onto feature eleven times before making his spell permanent, following his release from Leyton Orient.

Prior to the 2018–19 campaign, Pollock reunited with former manager, Sammy Moore at Concord Rangers and went onto make his debut against Gloucester City.

Career statistics

Honours
Concord Rangers
FA Trophy runner-up: 2019–20

References

External links

Living people
1998 births
Sportspeople from Basildon
Association football defenders
Concord Rangers F.C. players
Leatherhead F.C. players
Leyton Orient F.C. players
Wealdstone F.C. players
Wingate & Finchley F.C. players
English Football League players
Isthmian League players
English footballers